This article contains information about the literary events and publications of 14th century.


Events

1323 – The name Pléiade is adopted by a group of fourteen poets (seven men and seven women) in Toulouse.
1324: 3 May (Holy Cross Day) – The Consistori del Gay Saber, founded the previous year in Toulouse to revive and perpetuate the lyric poetry of the Old Occitan troubadors, holds its first contest. Arnaut Vidal de Castelnou d'Ari wins the violeta d'or (golden violet) for a sirventes in praise of the Virgin Mary. At about this date, Raimon de Cornet writes Doctrinal de trobar in support of the aims of the Gay Saber.
1327
Between 20 January and 21 September – The deposed King Edward II of England perhaps writes the "Lament of Edward II".
6 April (Good Friday) – Tuscan writer Petrarch sees a woman he names Laura in the church of Sainte-Claire d'Avignon, which awakes in him a lasting passion. He writes a series of sonnets and other poems in Italian dedicated to her up to about 1368, which are collected into Il Canzoniere, an influential model for Renaissance culture.
27 August – Death of Thomas Cobham, Bishop of Worcester in England. His books are bequeathed to the University of Oxford where they are installed in the University Church of St Mary the Virgin, forming the university's first library.
1329: February – French poet and composer Guillaume de Machaut is brought to the Siege of Medvėgalis by John of Bohemia so the king's crusading deeds can be commemorated in song and poetry.
c. 1330 – Production of the Macclesfield Psalter in East Anglia.
1331 – Production of the Nuremberg Mahzor.
1341: 8 April – Petrarch becomes poet laureate at a ceremony in Rome.
1357 – The Polychronicon concludes, Ranulf Higden having ceased work on it at least a dozen years earlier.
1360 – The future English writer Geoffrey Chaucer is captured by the French during the Reims campaign of the Hundred Years' War and ransomed by King Edward III of England.
1362: September – Petrarch's library is donated to the Republic of Venice, although subsequently dispersed.
1368
The new Hongwu Emperor in China halts government taxation on books.
The Bibliothèque nationale de France (National Library of France) is founded as the Royal Library at the Louvre Palace in Paris by Charles V of France.

1370–1398 – Approximate date of production of the earliest part of the Sankt Florian Psalter, one of the earliest surviving texts to use the Polish language.
1372 – Old Permic alphabet introduced by Stephen of Perm.
1374
23 April: English writer Geoffrey Chaucer is granted a gallon of wine a day for the rest of his life by order of King Edward III of England in recognition of his services.
Ludolph of Saxony completes his Vita Christi, which appears first in book form in 1474 and becomes an influence on St Ignatius Loyola in the early 16th century.
1377 – Production of the earliest known copy of the Laurentian Codex.
1381: 30 May–November – Peasants' Revolt in England. Preacher John Ball apparently cites the poem Piers Plowman (which is revised during this decade) and John Gower includes an account of the events in his Vox Clamantis. On 15 June, the University of Cambridge's library and archives are burnt in the centre of the town, with one Margery Starre leading the mob in a dance to the rallying cry "Away with the learning of clerks, away with it!". The events inspire the late 16th century play The Life and Death of Jack Straw, Robert Southey's dramatic poem Wat Tyler (1794), and novels such as Pierce Egan the Younger's Wat Tyler (1841), William Harrison Ainsworth's Merry England (1874) and William Morris's A Dream of John Ball (1886).
1382 – Earliest recorded appearance of Wycliffe's Bible.
1384 – Henry of Langenstein writes his letter, De scismate, to Echard von Dersch, Bishop of Worms.
1386: October – Geoffrey Chaucer is obliged to give up most of his official offices in London and retires to Kent where he may work on The Canterbury Tales.
1388 – Revision of Wycliffe's Bible is completed by John Purvey, and Wyclif's followers, known as Lollards, begin to be persecuted in England.
1390–1 – Production of the Book of Ballymote in Ireland.
1390s – Production of the Yellow Book of Lecan in Ireland.
1397 – Production of the Kiev Psalter in Kiev Rus.
1398 – The early 13th century carved wooden text of the Tripitaka Koreana is moved to the Haeinsa Buddhist temple in modern-day South Korea, where it will remain into the 21st century.
unknown dates
The prose original of the Amadis de Gaula is produced (or perhaps translated into Old Spanish from an earlier 14th-century version), perhaps by the knight Vasco de Lobeira or the troubador João de Lobeira.
Madhava Kandali produces the Saptakanda Ramayana (a retelling of the Ramayana), one of the earliest written examples of the Assamese language and the first translation from Sanskrit into one of the modern regional Indo-Aryan languages.

New works
c. 1300
Anonymous – Gesta Romanorum
Taliesin – Book of Taliesin, Middle Welsh. Taliesin (c. 534 – c. 599) is a Brythonic bard of Sub-Roman Britain believed to have sung at the courts of at least three Celtic British kings.
Marguerite Porete – The Mirror of Simple Souls
Rustichello da Pisa – The Travels of Marco Polo
c. 1300–10
Gona Budda Reddy – Ranganatha ramayan (శ్రీ రంగనాథ రామాయణం) (Telugu language)
Early to mid-14th century
Shihāb al-Dīn Ahmad bin 'Abd al-Wahhāb al-Nuwayri – The Ultimate Ambition in the Arts of Erudition (encyclopedia of Muslim knowledge)
Anonymous Middle English writer from southern England (possible author of all following)
King Alisaunder
Of Arthour and of Merlin
Richard Coer de Lyon
The Seven Sages of Rome
Pseudo-Bonaventure – Meditations on the Life of Christ
Der Busant
Long Life of Saint Gerard (Legenda maior S. Gerardi, compiled)
1307
John of Gaddesden – Rosa Medicinæ
Rashid al-Din Hamadani – Jami' al-Tawarikh ("Compendium of Chronicles", often referred to as The Universal History or History of the World, published in Tabriz, Persia)
</onlyinclude>
c. 1308–21
Dante Alighieri – Divine Comedy (Comedia)
c. 1309–24
Speculum Humanae Salvationis
The Book of Dede Korkut
1310
Amir Khusrow – Khazain-ul-Futuh
1310–1320
Queen Mary Psalter
1312
Jacques de Longuyon – Les Voeux du paon (The Vows of the Peacock)
1315–16
Amir Khusrow – Duval Rani–Khizr Khan (Romance of Duval Rani and Khizr Khan; masnavi)
c. 1315–25
Rochefoucauld Grail
1316–18
Amir Khusrow – Noh-Sepehr (Nine Skies; masnavi)
1318
Arnaut Vidal de Castelnou d'Ari – Guilhem de la Barra
c. 1320–35
Erikskrönikan
c. 1320–30
Jacob of Liège – Speculum musicae
1320
Dante Alighieri – Quaestio de Aqua et Terra
Amir Khusrow – Tughluq Nama (Book of the Tughluqs; prose)
1320–23
William of Pagula – Oculus Sacerdotis (Priest's Eye, a manual for priests)
c. 1321
Liber Legum Regum Antiquorum (attributed to Andrew Horn)
c. 1321–23
Sānguózhì Pínghuà (三國志平話, "Story of Records of the Three Kingdoms")
1326
Ibn Abi Zar – Rawd al-Qirtas
1328
Ramon Muntaner - Chronicle (Crònica), the longest of The Four Great Catalan Chronicles
c. 1329–32
Yoshida Kenkō (吉田 兼好) – Tsurezuregusa (Essays in Idleness)
1330
Robert of Basevorn – The Form of Preaching (date of first known MS)
'Michael' – Kildare Poems (MS of about this date)
c. 1330–40
Perceforest
1330–43
Juan Ruiz, Archpriest of Hita – The Book of Good Love (El Libro de Buen Amor)
c. 1330–1400
Luo Guanzhong (attributed) – Romance of the Three Kingdoms (三國演義)
1335
Matthew Blastares (compiler) – Syntagma Canonum
Lê Tắc – An Nam chí lược (安南志略)
Don Juan Manuel – Tales of Count Lucanor
1335–40
Giovanni Boccaccio – Il Filostrato
1338–14 (first published 1396–1397)
Petrarch – Africa
1340
Michael of Northgate (translator) – Ayenbite of Inwyt
c. 1340
 Anonymous - The Ointment Seller
c. 1340–41
Giovanni Boccaccio – Teseida
c. 1340–1349
Dafydd ap Gwilym – The Girls of Llanbadarn and The Seagull
1345
Richard de Bury – The Philobiblon
1346
Toqto'a (Yuan Dynasty) (editor) – History of Song (宋史, Sòng Shǐ)
c. 1350
Baudouin de Sebourc (probably from Hainaut)
Prick of Conscience (Yorkshire)
White Book of Rhydderch
The Tale of Gamelyn (anonymous)
c. 1352
Bahubali Pandita of Sringeri – Dharmanathapuranam
Wynnere and Wastoure (anonymous)
1353
Giovanni Boccaccio – The Decameron
c. 1355
Giovanni Boccaccio – Corbaccio
c. 1360–84
John of Fordun – Chronica Gentis Scotorum
1365
Mpu Prapanca – Nagarakretagama
c. 1367
William Langland (presumed author) – Piers Plowman (earliest likely date)
1369
Geoffrey Chaucer – The Book of the Duchess
1370
Bureau of History of the Ming dynasty, under direction of Song Lian – History of Yuan (元史, Yuán Shǐ)
1371
The Travels of Sir John Mandeville (anonymous)
Geoffroy IV de la Tour Landry – The Book of the Knight of the Tower
Kakuichi (compiler) – The Tale of the Heike (平家物語, Heike Monogatari)
Ibn Marzuq – The Correct and Fine Traditions About the Glorious Deeds of our Master Abu 'l-Hasan (Musnad as-sahid al-hasan fi maʿathir mawlana Abi 'l Hasan)
c. 1374
Beatrijs
1375
John Barbour – The Brus
1376
John Wycliffe – De civili dominio (On Civil Dominion)
1377
Ibn Khaldun – Muqaddimah (Prolegomena)
1378
Qu You – Jiandeng Xinhua (剪灯新话, "New stories told while trimming the wick")
1381
Amarkosh (अमरकोश, Sanskrit-Nepal Bhasa dictionary)
1382
Jacobus de Teramo – Consolatio peccatorum, seu Processus Luciferi contra Jesum Christum
Red Book of Hergest (soon after this date)
c. 1383
Sofonii of Razan – Zadonshchina
1384
Terç del Crestià, volume 3 of Lo Crestià
Late 1380s
Walter Hilton – The Scale of Perfection
1387
John Trevisa – translation of Ranulf Higden's Polychronicon, including "Dialogue on Translation Between a Lord and a Clerk"
1389
Gopalraj Vamshavali (गोपालराज वंशावली, a history of Nepal)
c. 1390
Anonymous – The Forme of Cury (earliest cookbook in the English language)
1390
John Gower – Confessio Amantis
1390s
Geoffrey Chaucer – The Canterbury Tales
1395
Lady Julian of Norwich – Revelations of Divine Love, first published book in English language to be written by a woman.
Mangaraja II – Mangaraja Nighantu (lexicon, 1398)
'Pearl Poet'
Sir Gawain and the Green Knight
Pearl
Cleanness
Patience
Sayana – commentary on the Vedas.
Ipomadon (Middle English tail-rhyme verse version; earliest likely date)
South English Legendary
Völsunga saga (approximate date of written version)
Water Margin (水浒传, Shui Hu Zhuan; approximate date of earliest components known)
c. 1399
Bernat Metge - The Dream (Lo Somni), first humanist work in Catalan.
Christine de Pizan
Cent Ballades d'Amant et de Dame, Virelyas, Rondeaux
L'Épistre au Dieu d'amours
L'Épistre de Othéa a Hector
Unknown 
Egils saga einhenda ok Ásmundar berserkjabana
Epic of Sundiata
Grettis saga (approximate date)
Kavi Malla – Manmathavijaya
Peterborough Psalter

Drama
Li Qianfu – Circle of Chalk
c. 1350 – Misteri d'Elx (Valencian)
1358–76 – Katherine of Sutton (adaptations) – Depositio, Descensus Christi, Elevatio and Visitatio
Late 14th century – Ordinalia (Middle Cornish)

Births
1303 – Bridget of Sweden (Birgitta Birgersdotter), Swedish mystic, writer and saint (died 1373)
1304 – Petrarch (Francesco Petrarca) Tuscan poet (died 1374)
1313 – Giovanni Boccaccio, Italian writer (died 1375)
c. 1315 or 1317 – Hafez, Persian poet (died 1390)
1320 – Lalleshwari, Kashmiri Hindu poet (died 1392)
1332: 27 May – Ibn Khaldun, North African historiographer and philosopher (died 1406)
c. 1332 – Catherine of Vadstena, Swedish mystic, writer and saint (died 1381)
1333 – Kan'ami (Kan'ami Kiyotsugu (観阿弥 清次), Japanese Noh actor (died 1384)
c. 1340–45 – Walter Hilton, English mystic writing in Latin and English (died 1396)
c. November 1342 – Julian of Norwich, English religious writer and mystic (died c. 1416)
1343 – Geoffrey Chaucer, English poet (died 1400)
1347 – Catherine of Siena, Italian theologian and saint (died 1380)
1348 – Jan of Jenštejn, Archbishop of Prague, writer, composer and poet (died 1400)
c. 1363 – Zeami Motokiyo (世阿弥 元清), Japanese Noh actor and playwright (died c. 1443)
1364 – Christine de Pizan, Venetian-born Middle French court poet and writer (died c. 1430)
c. 1368 – Thomas Hoccleve, English poet and clerk (died 1426)
c. 1373 – Margery Kempe, English mystic and autobiographer (died c. 1440)
1378 – Zhu Quan (朱權), Prince of Ning, Chinese military commander, feudal lord, historian and playwright (died 1448)
1384 – Enrique de Villena, Spanish writer, theologian and poet (died 1434)
1393 – John Capgrave, English historian and scholastic theologian (died 1464)
1398 – Íñigo López de Mendoza, 1st Marquis of Santillana, Castilian politician and poet (died 1458)

Deaths
After 1306 – Adam de la Halle, French trouvère poet (born c. 1237)
1308 – Duns Scotus, Scottish philosopher and theologian (born c. 1266)
1309 – Angela of Foligno, Italian mystic and saint (born 1248)
1310: 1 June – Marguerite Porete, French mystic (burnt as heretic, year of birth unknown)
1315: 10 March – Agnes Blannbekin, Austrian Beguine and Christian mystic (born c. 1244)
c. 1315 – Ramon Llull, Majorcan polymath and novelist in Catalan (born c. 1232)
1321: 14 September – Dante Alighieri, Italian poet (born c. 1265)
1325:
7 January – King Denis of Portugal, poet
October – Amir Khusrow, Sufi poet
1345: 14 April – Richard de Bury, English bishop and bibliophile (born 1287) 
1349: September – Richard Rolle, English hermit, mystic and religious writer (probably born between 1390 and 1400)
c. 1350 – Yoshida Kenkō (吉田 兼好), Japanese author and Buddhist monk (probably born 1283)
1364: 12 March – Ranulf Higden, English chronicler
1373: 23 July – Bridget of Sweden (Birgitta Birgersdotter), Swedish mystic, writer and saint
1374: 19 July – Petrarch, Italian poet
1375: 21 December – Giovanni Boccaccio, Italian poet
1377: April – Guillaume de Machaut, French poet and composer
1380:
29 April – Catherine of Siena, Italian theologian and saint
2 December – John of Ruysbroeck (Jan van Ruysbroeck), Flemish mystic (born 1293 or 1294)
1381: 24 March – Catherine of Vadstena, Swedish mystic, writer and saint
1384:
 8 June – Kan'ami (Kan'ami Kiyotsugu, 観阿弥 清次), Japanese Noh playwright and actor (born 1333);
 December – John Wycliffe, philosopher, translator and theologian (born c.1320);
 Mir Sayyid Ali Hamadani, Persian Sūfī, poet scholar.
1392 – Lalleshwari, Kashmiri Shaivite poet and mystic
1395: 13 March – John Barbour, Scottish poet
1396: 24 March – Walter Hilton, English Augustinian mystic writing in Latin and English (born c. 1340–45)
1400: 25 October – Geoffrey Chaucer, English poet (born c. 1343)

See also
 14th century in poetry
 13th century in literature
 15th century in literature
 List of years in literature

References 

 
Medieval literature
Renaissance literature
History of literature
Lit